RKVFC Sithoc is a Curaçao football team playing In the first division of Curaçao League. The team is based in Willemstad, Curaçao. It was founded on March 7, 1942.

Achievements
Netherlands Antilles Championship: 9
1960, 1961, 1962, 1990, 1991, 1992, 1993, 1995,  1999

Curaçao League: 9
1960, 1961, 1986, 1989, 1990, 1991, 1992, 1993, 1995

Performance in CONCACAF competitions
CFU Club Championship: 1 appearances
CFU Club Championship 2000 – First Round In Group stage – (Caribbean Zone) – hosted by  Joe Public in Trinidad and Tobago.

CONCACAF Champions' Cup: 8 appearances
CONCACAF Champions' Cup 1962 – Semi-Finals – Lost to  CSD Comunicaciones 3 – 1 in the global result.
CONCACAF Champions' Cup 1963 – First Round – (Caribbean Zone) – Lost to  Racing CH 4 – 1 in the global result.
CONCACAF Champions' Cup 1981 – Third Round – (Caribbean Zone) – Lost to  SV Robinhood 5 – 1 in the global result.
CONCACAF Champions' Cup 1990 – Second Round – (Caribbean Zone) – Lost to  Excelsior 6 – 1 in the global result.
CONCACAF Champions' Cup 1991 – First Round – (Caribbean Zone) – Lost to  AS Capoise 4 – 3 in the global result.
CONCACAF Champions' Cup 1992 – Third Round – (Caribbean Zone) – Lost to  Aiglon du Lamentin 3 – 3 (2–4 pen).
CONCACAF Champions' Cup 1993 – Second Round – (Caribbean Zone) – Lost to  SV Robinhood 4 – 2 in the global result.
CONCACAF Champions' Cup 1994 – Second Round – (Caribbean Zone) – Lost to  Newtown United 3 – 0 in the global result.

Current squad 2013–14

References

Sithoc RKV
Sithoc RKV
Association football clubs established in 1942
1942 establishments in Curaçao